John Chorlton (1666, Salford – 16 May 1705, Manchester) was an English presbyterian minister and tutor.

Life
John Chorlton was born at Salford in 1666. On 4 April 1682 he was admitted to be educated for the ministry at Rathmell Academy under Richard Frankland. On completing his studies he was chosen (7 Aug. 1687) as assistant to Henry Newcome, the founder of nonconformity in Manchester. On 8 March 1689 he married Hannah, daughter of Joseph Leeche.

On Newcome's death (17 Sept. 1695) he became pastor. The congregation on 14 Oct. 1695 invited Oliver Heywood to become his colleague, but the old man declined to leave Northowram. An assistant was obtained (1697) in the person of an adventurer passing under the name of Gaskeld, who, after pleasing the Manchester presbyterians with his learning and eloquence, disappeared (1698) with a borrowed horse, made his way to Hull (where he called himself Midgely, and falsely represented himself as one of the authors of Letters Writ by a Turkish Spy), and finally fled to Holland.

On Frankland's death (1 Oct. 1698) at Rathmell, Chorlton, with great spirit, resolved to continue Frankland's 'northern academy', transferring it to Manchester. Accordingly on 21 March 1699 he ‘set up teaching university learning in a great house at Manchester.’ Eleven of Frankland's students finished their course with him, and the names of twenty others who studied under him are known. His most distinguished student was Thomas Dixon. James Clegg, one of the transferred students, is our chief authority on the mode in which the academy was conducted. He describes Chorlton as a worthy successor to Frankland, and superior as a preacher. Matthew Henry speaks of his ‘extraordinary quickness and readiness of expression; a casuist, one of a thousand, a wonderful clear head.’ Chorlton now wanted assistance both in the pulpit and in the academy. Applications were made in 1699 to James Owen of Oswestry and Thomas Bradbury, both of whom declined. Next year the services of James Coningham were secured. The ‘provincial meeting’ of Lancashire ministers gave a public character to the academy, passing resolutions in its favour and raising funds for its support. At the summer assizes of 1703 Chorlton was presented for keeping a public academy, but through private influence the prosecution was stayed.

Chorlton's labours were cut short in his prime. He suffered from stone, and died in his fortieth year on 16 May 1705; he was buried at the collegiate church (now Manchester Cathedral) on 19 May.

Works
(Anon.) Notes upon the Lord Bishop of Salisbury's four Discourses to the Clergy of his Diocess … relating to the Dissenters, &c., 1695, 4to
 The Glorious Reward of Faithful Ministers, &c., 1696, 4to. Funeral sermon [Dan. xii. 3] for Henry Newcome. Robert Halley reckoned it "one of the best of the nonconformist funeral sermons". Preface by John Howe.
 (Anon.) Dedication to Lord Willoughby, and 'Brief Account of the Life of the Author', prefixed to Henry Pendlebury's Invisible Realities, &c., 1696, 12mo.

See also
Cross Street Chapel

References

1666 births
1705 deaths
English Presbyterian ministers
17th-century Presbyterian ministers
Dissenting academy tutors